Abdulla Nasser Al-Mousa is a footballer. He currently plays as a midfielder for the Al Muzahimiyyah club in Saudi Arabia.

Al-Mousa started playing for the first team in the 2007-2008 season.

References

External links
 

Saudi Arabian footballers
Living people
Al Nassr FC players
Al-Riyadh SC players
Al-Muzahimiyyah Club players
Saudi First Division League players
Saudi Professional League players
Saudi Second Division players
1988 births
Association football midfielders